Chacas is a district of the province Asunción in the Ancash Region of Peru. Its seat is Chacas.

Geography 
The Cordillera Blanca traverses the district. Some of the highest peaks of the district are Wallqan and Yanarahu. Other mountains are listed below:

Ethnic groups 
The people in the district are mainly indigenous citizens of Quechua descent. Quechua is the language which the majority of the population (72.01%) learnt to speak in childhood, 26.42% of the residents started speaking Spanish (2007 Peru Census).

See also 
 Alliqucha
 Ancash Quechua
 Lawriqucha
 Paryaqucha
 Pataqucha
 Runtuqucha
 Waqramarka
 Yanaqucha
 Yanarahu Lake

References

Districts of the Asunción Province
Districts of the Ancash Region